92.5 Radyo Rapido (DXKG 92.5 MHz) is an FM station owned and operated by Sarraga Integrated and Management Corporation. Its studios and transmitter are located at Rafael Alunan Ave., Brgy. Poblacion, Koronadal.

References

External links
Radyo Rapido Koronadal FB Page

Radio stations in South Cotabato
Radio stations established in 2016